Art music (alternatively called classical music, cultivated music, serious music, and canonic music) is music considered to be of high phonoaesthetic value. It typically implies advanced structural and theoretical considerations or a written musical tradition. In this context, the terms "serious" or "cultivated" are frequently used to present a contrast with ordinary, everyday music (i.e. popular and folk music, also called "vernacular music"). Many cultures have art music traditions; in the Western world the term typically refers to Western classical music.

Definition
In Western literature, "Art music" is mostly used to refer to music descending from the tradition of Western classical music. Musicologist Philip Tagg refers to the elitism associated with art music as one of an "axiomatic triangle consisting of 'folk', 'art' and 'popular' musics". He explains that each of these three is distinguishable from the others according to certain criteria. According to Bruno Nettl, "Western classical music" may also be synonymous with "art music", "canonic music", "cultivated music", "serious music", as well as the more flippantly used "real music" and "normal music". Musician Catherine Schmidt-Jones defines art music as "a music which requires significantly more work by the listener to fully appreciate than is typical of popular music". In her view, "[t]his can include the more challenging types of jazz and rock music, as well as Classical".

The term "art music" refers primarily to classical traditions (including contemporary as well as historical classical music forms) that focus on formal styles, invite technical and detailed deconstruction and criticism, and demand focused attention from the listener. In strict western practice, art music is considered primarily a written musical tradition, preserved in some form of music notation, as opposed to being transmitted orally, by rote, or in recordings (like popular and traditional music).

Popular music
There have been continual attempts throughout the history of popular music to make a claim for itself as art rather than as popular culture, and a number of music styles that were previously understood as "popular music" have since been categorized in the art or classical category. According to the academic Tim Wall, the most significant example of the struggle between Tin Pan Alley, African-American, vernacular, and art discourses was in jazz. As early as the 1930s, artists attempted to cultivate ideas of "symphonic jazz", taking it away from its perceived vernacular and black American roots. Following these developments, histories of popular music tend to marginalize jazz, partly because the reformulation of jazz in the art discourse has been so successful that many (as of 2013) would not consider it a form of popular music.

At the beginning of the 20th century, art music was divided into "serious music" and "light music". During the second half of the century, there was a large-scale trend in American culture toward blurring the boundaries between art and pop music. Beginning in 1966, the degree of social and artistic dialogue among rock musicians dramatically accelerated for bands who fused elements of composed music with the oral musical traditions of rock. During the late 1960s and 1970s, progressive rock bands represented a form of crossover music that combined rock with high art musical forms either through quotation, allusion, or imitation. Progressive music may be equated with explicit references to aspects of art music, sometimes resulting in the reification of rock as art music.

While progressive rock is often cited for its merging of high culture and low culture, few artists incorporated literal classical themes in their work to any great degree, as author Kevin Holm-Hudson explains: "sometimes progressive rock fails to integrate classical sources ... [it] moves continuously between explicit and implicit references to genres and strategies derived not only from European art music, but other cultural domains (such as East Indian, Celtic, folk, and African) and hence involves a continuous aesthetic movement between formalism and eclecticism".

See also
 List of classical and art music traditions
Art song
 Music genre
 Progressive music
 Traditional music

References

Further reading

External links
 

 
Music genres
Musicology